High Kelling is a village and civil parish in the north of the English county of Norfolk. The village is located on the A148 road which links Cromer to King's Lynn. The village is 1.7 miles east of the town of Holt, and 7.8 miles west of Cromer. High Kelling is within the area covered by North Norfolk District Council. In the last Census, carried out in 2001, the population of High Kelling was counted as 515, increasing to 636 at the 2011 census.

The District Church

All Saints Church is a District Church in the Parish of Holt with High Kelling. The building was built in 1924 and was the chapel of Bramblewood Sanatorium which cared for the sufferers of tuberculosis. After the Sanatorium closed in 1955, the residents of High Kelling purchased the chapel for £500 for their place of worship. The Chapel became licensed for worship in 1970 although it had been then in use for 15 years. In 1977 the Chapel became part of the ecclesiastical parish of Holt.

Railway station
The heritage railway of the North Norfolk Railway known as the "Poppy Line" runs from near-by Sheringham via Weybourne to Holt. Holt station, although in Holt parish, shares a common boundary with High Kelling.

Amenities
High Kelling has its own post office and shop located on the Cromer Road (A148). In Selbrigg Road there is a nursery which sells locally grown plants and shrubs. Kelling Hospital is situated on a site of 8.5 hectares and provides a range of services and care. The site is also used on a regular basis as a destination for mobile diagnostic service such as breast cancer screening. The hospital is also the site of the Holt Medical Practice.

See also
Kelling also known as Lower Kelling and as Low Kelling
Kelling Heath
Home Place, Kelling

References

Further reading 

 History Group of High Kelling Society, ' 'The birth of a village - a history of High Kelling' '. High Kelling, Holt, Norfolk: High Kelling Society, 2000, 94 p.

External links

Villages in Norfolk
Civil parishes in Norfolk
North Norfolk